Florence Isabirye Muranga is a Ugandan biochemist, food scientist, academic and corporate executive, who serves as the executive director of the Presidential Initiative on Banana Industrial Development (PIBID), a presidential project started in an effort to boost the commercialization of Uganda's bananas through research and industrialization.

Background and education
She was born in present-day Mayuge District circa 1952, and attended "Kabuli Primary School" for her elementary school education. For her secondary school studies, she attended Gayaza High School, a prestigious boarding girls' middle and high school, located in Gayaza, Wakiso District.

In 1975 she graduated from Makerere University, Uganda's largest and oldest public university, graduating with a Bachelor of Science degree and a Diploma in Education, awarded in 1975. In 1990, she was awarded a Master of Science in Food Science by the University of Reading in the United Kingdom. Later in 2000, she graduated with a Doctor of Philosophy degree in Biochemistry, from Makerere University.

Work experience
Before her retirement, Florence Isabirye Muranga was a Professor of Nutrition and Biochemistry in the Department of Food Technology and Nutrition at Makerere University. She has special interest in the nutritional value of the banana fruit, particularity the variety called matooke. She has published widely and extensively regarding her research on the subject.

Banana research
In 2005 Professor Muranga had an encounter with the president of Uganda, Yoweri Museveni, and the president was impressed with the professor's research. Two years later, the president established the Presidential Initiative on Banana Industrial Development (PIBID) and named Muranaga the Executive Director.

PIBID established a banana farm on a  piece of land and a modern matooke processing factory in the town of Bushenyi, in Bushenyi District in the Western Region of Uganda.

Family
Florence Muranga is married to Manuel Muranga since 1978 and together they are the parents of two sons.

Other considerations
In November 2016, the president of Uganda appointed a commission of inquiry into the affairs of Makerere University and named Professor Florence Muranga       as one of its nine members. In 2006, the Management Forum of the British Council, based in London, United Kingdom, recognized Professor Muranga as one of the "Top Women in 2006". At home, she won the Presidential Scientific Innovation Excellence Award at the 2005/06 Presidential Science Awards in recognition of her pomneering work on the matooke fruit. Since about 2000, Florence Muranga has served as an Assistant Chaplain at Saint Francis Chapel, the principal Anglican church at Makerere University campus in Kampala, Uganda's capital and largest city.

See also
 Makerere University
 Agriculture in Uganda
 Economy of Uganda

References

External links
Website of Presidential Initiative on Banana Industrial Development (PIBID)  
Presidential Initiative on Banana Industrial Development (PIBID) at Risk of Having no Funds over its Legality

Living people
1952 births
Makerere University alumni
People from Mayuge District
People from Eastern Region, Uganda
Ugandan Christians
Women food scientists
20th-century Ugandan women scientists
Ugandan women academics
Academic staff of Makerere University
People educated at Gayaza High School